The 2004 Four Nations Tournament was the fourth edition of this invitational women's football tournament held in China with four national teams participating in a round robin format. It was held from January 30 to February 3, 2004, in the city of Shenzhen.

Final standings

Match results

References

2004 in women's association football
2004
2004 in Chinese football
2004 in American women's soccer
2004 in Swedish women's football
2004 in Canadian women's soccer
January 2004 sports events in Asia
2004 in Chinese women's sport
February 2004 sports events in Asia